Drexel 4041 is a 17th-century British music manuscript commonplace book. As described by musicologist John P. Cutts, Drexel 4041 "is a treasure-house of early seventeenth-century song and dramatic lyric worthy of the attention of any student of seventeenth-century literature and drama." It is also a major source for the work of English composer William Lawes. Belonging to the New York Public Library, it forms part of the Drexel Collection, housed in the Music Division of the New York Public Library for the Performing Arts. Following traditional library practice, its name is derived from its call number.

Dating 
Drexel 4041 dates from between 1640 and 1650.  Royalist songs near the end of the manuscript point to its completion in the late 1640s For this reason Cutts suggests the date 1649 based on the songs' content.

Physical description 

Drexel 4041 measures  and is composed of 144 folios, including two leaves for tables of contents. It lacks the introductory and concluding leaves typically found in similar manuscripts on which would indicate ownership by means of signatures or similar inscriptions.

One of the manuscript's idiosyncratic features are its two tables of contents, both incomplete. The first table of contents begins on folio 1 verso and is numbered 1-79, leaving the remainder of the page blank.  No table is made for the next 20 songs. The second table of contents begins on folio 2 recto with the song "Fly boy, fly boy to the sellers" (numbered 100 below) and continues through number 38.  Because of this peculiar numbering in the two tables of contents, Willa McClung Evans, a scholar who earlier studied the manuscript, surmised it might have been a conglomeration of several manuscripts "representing perhaps the tastes of three owners of the volume or of three periods in the life of a single owner."  She considered the handwriting from several unidentified hands. Cutts believed the manuscript to be the work of a single owner.

Cutts questions why some songs are unnumbered.  He surmises that, presumably, the scribe added songs after compiling the tables of contents without making additions to the table.  He noted that, like British Library Add. 29481, Egerton Ms. 2013, and New York Public Library Drexel 4175, several manuscripts of this period have at least two series of contents.

In 1973 the manuscript underwent conservation by Carolyn Horton and Associates which included numbering the folios.

Handwriting 
The manuscript appears to be the work of a single scribe. It is not work of a professional copyist but of a secretarial hand, consistent in its use of italics. Based on the idiosyncratic natures of letters such as "e", "r" and "c," Cutts attributes an Italian influence to the scribe. An unusual attribute of this scribe is that he tends to write v for u, resulting in words such as "thov" (thou). The calligraphy is difficult due to many cross outs and obscuring of letters due to an unsharpened quill and smudging.

The contents were entered over a period time suggesting a commonplace book. Cutts discerns that scribe must have had access to other manuscripts circulating among court and theatrical musicians based on the variety of composer names associated with both spheres.

Most of the marginalia was added by its former owner Edward F. Rimbault.

Provenance 
Rimbault wrote that the earliest known owner of Drexel 4041 was Robert Shirley, 1st Earl Ferrers.  The manuscript stayed within his family at their estate in Staunton Harold. Rimbault obtained it from the descendants for his own collection.

An organist and musicologist, Rimbault took a keen interest in English music and voraciously collected rare books, scores, and valuable manuscripts. Upon his death, his extensive and valuable library was auctioned by Sotheby's over the course of five days. The Sotheby catalogue entry for this manuscript reads:

Songs (A Collection of), by Dr. John Wilson, Henry and William Lawes, Dr. Charles Colman, Robert Johnson, Thomas Brewer, John Taylor, John Atkins, and other Composers of the 17th century, calf, folio.

The manuscript along with about 300 lots were purchased by Philadelphia-born financier Joseph W. Drexel, who had already amassed a large music library. Upon Drexel's death, he bequeathed his music library to The Lenox Library. When the Lenox Library merged with the Astor Library to become the New York Public Library, the Drexel Collection became the basis for one of its founding units, the Music Division. Today, Drexel 4041 is part of the Drexel Collection in the Music Division, now located at the New York Public Library for the Performing Arts at Lincoln Center.

Attributions 
Although a high proportion of songs have composer attributions (or abbreviations suggesting attributions), they are inconsistent and not always reliable. Already in 1856, Rimbault (at the time still in possession of the manuscript) identified the actor "Jack Wilson" as the composer of several songs "as is proved by a book of manuscript music, as old in some parts as the time of the English Civil War, although in others it seems to have been written in the reign of Charles II of England. That song is there found with Wilson's name at the end of it, as the author of the music: unluckily the manuscript says nothing regarding the authorship of the words..."

Cutts notes the attribution of "mr Eynes" to the song "Collin say why sitts thou soe." However, he recognizes the setting is that of Nicholas Lanier, as confirmed in three other contemporaneous manuscripts, and wonders how the scribe could have derived "Eynes" from "Lanier."

As an example of a typically puzzling situation, Jorgens takes the song "O tell mee damon canst thou proue."  The initials on the song are W.L., suggesting William Lawes is the composer, a hypothesis that gains weight when considering the number of songs by him in the collection.  She quotes Cutts who declares the setting is "the only extant version of William Lawes's setting," pointing out further that "Drexel 4257, 161 contains William Webb's setting and it was Webb's that was published in Select Musicall Ayres and Dialogues, 1652, 1I.32 and 1653.  Unfortunately Cutts is wrong; the setting in Drexel 4257 is the same as in Drexel 4041; so is the composer Lawes, or Webb?" Jorgens concludes that only with the availability of many manuscript facsimiles and early printed editions can correct composer attributions be made.

According to Lefkowitz, it is only through collation of Drexel 4041 with other allied manuscripts (such as Drexel 4257, British Library Add. 31432, as well as the manuscripts in the Bodleian Library) that attributions and correct musical texts can be determined.

Content 

The contents of the manuscript suggest the owner liked the theatre, as there are lyrics to at least 30 plays. The collection is unusual in that most of the texts can be identified. 
Cutts surmises that these compilations of music manuscripts, while giving the impression of commonplace books, also suggest that the music and poetry of theatre musicians were circulated among each other, influencing their compositional development.

Evans remarks upon the song "Why soe pall and wan fond louer" and notes that it was probably written and known prior to its appearance in John Suckling's play Aglaura, based on the character Orsames's comments to it: "I little foolish counsel, Madame, I gave / a Friend of mine four or fives years ago / When he was falling into a consumption." Evans notes that the song was easy to perform, so that it could be sung by regular members of the acting company (rather than a professional singer).  L.A. Beaurline states that this  setting of "Why So Pale and Wan" is the earliest existing musical setting of this lyric.

Cutts remarks that "it is virtually impossible to be certain that particular songs are not actually separate songs but sections of others." Clearly some songs gave Cutts trouble; where he saw two songs beginning at folio 89 verso ("Come from the dungeon to the throne" followed by "Thou O bright sun"), Jorgens renders these as a single song.

Musicologist Vincent J. Duckles notes the first song, "Beauty which all men admire" must have had some currency as it is found in two other contemporaneous manuscripts.  He calls it a "tour de force" of harmonic experimentation work, showing the early Baroque range of harmonic freedom to an extent rarely found in English music.

The song "Oh let us howl" from John Webster's play The Duchess of Malfi has received attention.  An unnamed reviewer commented that it is the only source that provides a satisfactory thorough bass for the work.  Duckles finds it "particularly interesting because it is written for a tenor voice, joined by the bass in a 2-part chorus in the last section "At last when as our quire wants breath . . . ", an arrangement which may well have been the one employed in the original  production of the play. Furthermore, it bears a contemporary attribution to Robert Johnson as the composer. What Mr. Cutts has been able to conjecture on stylistic grounds is thus confirmed by solid documentary evidence."

Cutts regarded the marginal note on 124v "he/my/King/too" as evidence that the compiler was royalist in sympathy and identified himself with the song's denunciation of the adversaries of King Charles I of England.  This evidence led Cutts to believe the collection was assembled prior to the execution of Charles I in 1649.

Evans notes that the text of "A Loose Sarabande" by Richard Lovelace offers textual variants.

List of contents 
Many of the text attributions and other remarks are from Cutts (1964) and RISM.

{| class="wikitable" style="width:98%;"
|-
!Number!!width=60|Folios   !!Title  !!Composer !!Lyricist !! width=350|Remarks
|-
| 1	||3r	||Beuty wch all men admire	||John Wilson ||	||
|-
| 2	||3v-4r	||0 doe nott goe from us and bringe ||John Wilson 	||	||
|-
| 3	||4r	||Tell me nott I my time Misspend	||John Wilson	|| John Dryden? Philip King? || attributed to either John Eaton, John Dryden or Philip King
|-
| 4	||5r-5v	||Thou artt nott faire for all thy red and whight  ||Nicholas Lanier || Thomas Campion ||Setting of Thomas Campion's Song XII in his Booke of Ayres, 1601
|-
| 5	||6r	||Wher[e] did you borrow that last sigh || William Lawes || William Berkeley || from The Lost Lady (1637)
|-
| 6	||6r-6v	||Why should greatt bewty uertuous fame desier ||William Lawes || William Davenant ||
|-
| 7	||6v-7v	||Wee show noe monsstrous crockadell ||William Lawes ||  Jasper Mayne || from The City Match (1637)
|-
| 8	||7v-8v	||Why soe pall and wan fond louer	||William Lawes	|| John Suckling || from Aglaura (1637)
|-
| 9	||8v-9r	||Noe [noe] faire heriticke ||Henry Lawes  || John Suckling ||from Aglaura (1637); possibly composed by William Lawes; published in Select Musicall Ayres and Dialogues (1652); Select Ayres and Dialogues (1659); The Treasury of Musick (1669)
|-
| 10	||9r-9v	||0 draw your curtaines and appeare ||William Lawes  || William Davenant  || from the play Love and Honour (1634)
|-
| 11	||10r	||Som say my loue is butt a man || John Wilson 	|| Richard Brome || Text from The Northern Lass (1629)
|-
| 12	||10v-11r	||Nor loue nor fate dare I acuse ||John Wilson || Richard Brome  || Text from The Northern Lass (1629)
|-
| 13	||11r-11v	||A bony [bony] bird I haue ||John Wilson ||Richard Brome  || Text from The Northern Lass (1629)
|-
| 14	||12r	||Sullen care why dost thou keepe ||William Lawes || ||
|-
| 15	||12v-13r  ||Fill fill ye bowele ye lusty wyne will dye ||William Lawes || ||For two voices
|-
| 16	||13r-13v	||I am confermd a woman can ||Henry Lawes || John Suckling  ||
|-
| 17	||13v-14r	||Downe [downe downe] be still you seas || John Wilson ||  || Published in Wilson's Cheerful Ayres (1659-1660), without attribution
|-
| 18	||14v-15v	||0 let mee still and silentt lye ||William Lawes || ||
|-
| 19	||15v-16r	||Com shepherds com, Com away with out delay	||William Lawes?  || Francis Beaumont, John Fletcher || from The Faithful Shepherdess (1607)
|-
| 20	||16r	||In enuye of the night 	||William Lawes	||James Shirley || from The Triumph of Peace (1634)
|-
| 21	||16v	||As I was gathering aprill flowers  ||John Wilson || Richard Brome || Text from The Northern Lass  (1629)
|-
| 22	||17r	||Com follow me you cuntry Lasses || || John Fletcher || from Fletcher's The Maid in the Mill (1623)
|-
| 23	||17v	||You shall have crownes of roses dayses || John Gamble? 	|| John Fletcher  || Text from The Maid in the Mill (1623)
|-
| 24	||17v-18r	||When ye deer sun with his beames hott	||John Wilson	|| ||Treble only
|-
| 25	||18v	||Cupids wearie of the court 	||William Lawes ||	|| Published in New Ayres and Dialogues (1678)
|-
| 26	||19r	||Twas not his parson nor his partes	||	||	||
|-
| 27	||19v-20r	||Somnus the vmble God that dwles in cottages 	||William Lawes? ||John Denham  || from The Sophy (1641)
|-
| 28	||20v-21r	||I lost my hart ye other day	||John Wilson 	||  ||
|-
| 29	||21v-22r	||The larke now leaues his wattry nest 	||William Lawes	||William Davenant  ||Two voices; published in Wilson's Cheerful Ayres (1659-1660)
|-
| 30	||22v-23r	||Of thee kind boy I aske noe red and whight	||Nicholas Lanier	||John Suckling	|| [added in later hand; alternative setting on following page, without full text, attributed by Cutts to William Webb; see Cutts in Bibliography]; Text published in John Suckling's Fragmenta Aurea (1646) as Sonnet II
|-
| 31	||23v-24r	||O tell mee damon canst thou proue	|| William Lawes?	||	||
|-
| 32	||24r-24v	||There is none o none but I	|| John Wilson	|| Robert Aytoun || Setting of Ayton's "To a Scornful Mistresse"
|-
| 33	||24v	||To whome shall I complaine to men or gods	||William Lawes || ||Published in New Ayres and Dialogues (1678)
|-
| 34	||25r-26v	||Arm [arm arm arm] ye scuts are all com in ||Robert Johnson|| John Fletcher || Text from Fletcher's The Mad Lover (1617)
|-
| 35	||26v-27r	||I loue alas but daire not show it	||John Wilson	|| || Published in Select Musicall Ayres and Dialogues (1652) and Wilson's Cheerful Ayres (1659-1660)
|-
| 36	||27r-27v	||Ould poetes hippocrin admirer	||Henry Lawes 	|| Thomas Randolph ||Treble only; Text attributed to "N.N." by Lawes in his Ayres and Dialogues (1655) and to Thomas Randolph in Wit and Mirth (1684)
|-
| 37	||27v-28r	||Dost see how vnregarded now	|| John Atkins? || John Suckling ||Sonnet by John Suckling
|-
| 38	||28v-29v	||I obay I obay and am com to vew ye day || Thomas Holmes?  || John Fletcher ||“T H” added in later hand and might refer to Thomas Holmes;  from John Fletcher's The Humorous Lieutenant (1619)
|-
| 39	||29v-30r	||Com heavie sepe [=sleep] thov image of trve deth ||Robert Johnson? || John Lyly?	|| Text possibly by John Lyly
|-
| 40	||30v-31r	||If to be absent were to bee away from thee ||H L [Henry Lawes] || Richard Lovelace ||“H L” added in later hand
|-
| 41	||31r-31v	||Cloris now thou art fled away	||H L [Henry Lawes]	|| Henry Hughes ||Attributed to Hughes in Lawes's Ayres (1658) and his Select Ayres and Dialogues (1669)
|-
| 42	||31v-32v	||Why slightst thov her whome I aprove	|| John Atkins? ||Benjamin Rudyerd || Text ascribed to Rudyerd in Pembroke and Rudyard's Poems (1660)
|-
| 43	||33r-33v	||Aye me ye little Tyrant Theife ||Henry Lawes	||  [Richard Lovelace]	||“A loose Saraband-Lovelace poems 12ms 1649 p. 26” – added in Rimbault's hand
|-
| 44	||34r	||Take O take those lips away	|| John Wilson ||Francis Beaumont & John Fletcher ||From "The Tragedy of the Bloody Brother" [added in later hand], i.e. Rollo Duke of Normandy
|-
| 45	||34v	||Why will you sware I am forsworne	||Thomas Charles	||Richard Lovelace ||"Poems 12m 1649 p. 15" added in later hand
|-
| 46	||35r	||In loue away you doe me wrong	||John Atkins?	|| Henry Hughes ||Treble only
|-
| 47	||35v	||Vnfold thine armes & let me goe || Henry Lawes] ||	||
|-
| 48	||36r-36v	||Faire Archibella to thine eyes || John Taylor	|| Inigo Jones ||
|-
| 49	||36v-37r	||I coniure the [=thee] I coniure the, by the skin that is so faire	||J w [John Wilson?]	|| William Cavendish of Newcastle || Text from William Cavendish's play "The Varietie" (1639)
|-
| 50	||37v	||Thine eyes to mee like sonnes appeare	||John Wilson  || William Cavendish, 1st Duke of Newcastle  || Text from Cavendish's play The Varietie (1639); published in Cheerful Ayres
|-
| 51	||38r-38v	||Ide [=I’d] haue the [=thee] merry laugh and smile	|| John Wilson 	|| William Cavendish, 1st Duke of Newcastle ||  Text from Cavendish's play The Varietie (1639); published in Cheerful Ayres
|-
| 52	||38v-39r	||I sawre by muscadell that I doe loue the well 	||[John Wilson]	|| William Cavendish, 1st Duke of Newcastle || Text from Cavendish's play The Varietie (1639); published in Cheerful Ayres
|-
| 53	||39r-40r	||Deare loue let mee this euening die 	|| || William Davenant ||From Davenant's "The Dying Lover"; treble only; incorrectly numbered 54 in right margin
|-
| 54	||40r	||Though cupit be a god alas hese but a boy 	|| Henry Lawes	||	||
|-
| 55	||40v-41r	||Foolish boy forbeare & flee	||	||	||Treble only
|-
| 56	||41v-42r	||Wert thou yet fairer then thou art	|| John Atkins?  || Thomas Stanley ||
|-
| 57	||42r	||Cloris farewell I needs must goe || Henry Lawes  || || 
|-
| 58	||42v	||Rong [=wrong] not deare Empresse of my hart	|| || ||Treble only; another copy on 46r; see no. 65
|-
| 59	||43r	||Gather your Rosebuds whilst you may 	||William Lawes	|| Robert Herrick || Text from Robert Herrick's "Hesperides" (1648); published in New Ayres and Dialogues (1678)
|-
| 60	||43r-43v	||Since euery wone [=one] I come among	||Henry Lawes	|| Benjamin Rudyerd ||Treble only
|-
| 61	||44r	||Tell me not ye I dye or lieu by thee	||John Taylor || John Tatham|| Text from Ostella (1650)
|-
| 62	||44v-45r	||Oh stay by me doe not fly me	||	||	||
|-
| 63	||45r	||Tell me no more her eyes ar like towe rising sunns || William Lawes	|| || Published in Select Musicall Ayres and Dialogues (1652); Select Ayres and Dialogues (1659); and The Treasury of Musick (1669)
|-
| 64	||45v	||Still to be neat still to be drest	||[William Lawes] ||Ben Jonson	||Text from Ben Jonson's Epicœne, or The silent woman (1609) ; inscription “Ben Jonson” added in later hand;
|-
| 65	||46r	||Wrong not deere Empress of my hart	||	||	||Text has been attributed to Walter Raleigh, Robert Aytoun, and the Earl of Pembroke; with bass line; another copy on 42v; see no. 58
|-
| 66	||46v-47r ||Haue you obserud ye hermit when he runs ||John Gamble	|| || Published in Ayres and Dialogues (1659)
|-
| 67	||47r-47v ||What though my Mris frowne one [=on] me	||	||	||
|-
| 68	||48r	||Pleasure bewty youth attend ye ||William Lawes || John Ford || from The Lady's Trial; Wrongly attributed to Henry Lawes in Select Ayres and Dialogues (1669)
|-
| 69	||48v-49v	||Begon thou fatall fiery feauer	||	||	||
|-
| 70	||49v-50r	||I thought but to haue warmd me at thine eyes	|| John Taylor?	|| Inigo Jones ||
|-
| 71	||50v-51r	||If thou doest not loue sacke, & drinke whilst thou canst see	|| Henry Lawes?	||	||
|-
| 72	||51r-51v	||Out upon itt I have loued	||Henry Lawes	||John Suckling ||Treble only; authorial attribution added in later hand: At head of 1st system, f.51r: "Sir John Suckling ad: 1772" - p.53
|-
| 73	||52r	||Harke Harke how in euery groe	||William Lawes? || James Shirley || Text from Cupid's Call (1646)
|-
|   - || 52v    || || ||  || Page is blank
|- 
| 74	||53r-53v	||No I will sooner rust the winds ||Charles Coleman || Thomas Stanley ||
|-
| 75	||53v-54r	||Troth ladye Ile not court || || ||Text only; incomplete
|-
|  -  || 54v    || || ||  || Page is blank
|-
| 76	||55r-55v	||O my Clorissa thou crewel fayre ||William Lawes ||	|| Published in "Select ayres and dialogues"
|-
| 77	||56r-56v	||This lady ripe & fayre & fresh as eastern summers are	||John Atkins || William Davenant ||
|-
| 78	||56v-57v	||Take heede fayre Chloris how you tame	||	||  Henry Hughes ||
|-
| 79	||57v-58r	||Prethe dye & set me free	||	|| John Denham ||Bass line incomplete
|-
| 80	||58r-59r	||In faith I Cannot kepe my shepe sense first I grew to bee in love	||	||	||Treble only
|-
| 81	||59r-59v	||Youre loue if virtuous will shew forth	||Henry Lawes	||	||
|-
| 82	||60v-61r	||When the chill cherocco blowes and winter tells a heauy tale	||John Atkins	|| Thomas Bonham ||
|-
|   - || 61v-62r    || || ||  || Pages are blank
|-
| 83	||62v	||Noe twas hir eyes starrs haue noe influence	||Henry Lawes	||	||
|-
| 84	||63r	||Did I once say ye thou wert fayre	||Henry Lawes	||Henry Hughes || Published in Ayres and Dialogues (1658)
|-
| 85	||63v-64v	||Come com thou glorious obiect of my sight	||Henry Lawes	|| Thomas Killigrew || Text from Thomas Killegrew's Selindra; Published in Ayres and Dialogues (1653) and Select Ayres and Dialogues (1669)
|-
| 86	||65r	||Sweete Serena skylike flower	||John Wilson	|| Richard Lovelace ||"The Rose, Lovelace poems 12m 1649 page 11" [added in later hand]; 3rd verse is at the foot of 64v
|-
| 87	||65v	||Com cloris high wee too ye bower	||Henry Lawes	|| Henry Reynolds ||
|-
| 88	||66r-66v	||Tell me you wandering spirits of the Ayre	||Henry Lawes ||  || Published in Select Musicall Ayres and Dialogues (1652, 1653, 1659, 1669)
|-
| 89	||67r-67v	||Great Julius was a Cuckold	||	||	||Text only
|-
| 90	||67v-68r	||Full fadam fiue thy father lyes	||	||William Shakespeare	||Text only
|-
| 91	||68v-69r	||Bewty and loue once fell att odds	||Henry Lawes	|| || Published in Select Ayres and Dialogues (1652)
|-
| 92	||69v	||How coole and temprate I am growne	|| Henry Lawes ||	||
|-
|   - || 70r    || || ||  || Page is blank
|-
| 93	||70v-71v	||Thov dreges of lethey O thov dull	||	||	|| Included in Cleveland Revived (1660)
|-
| 94	||71v	||Tis now since I sate downe before ||John Atkins || John Suckling ||Nearly illegible ascription of text to Suckling, 1772, p. 30
|-
| 95	||72v-73r	||Change Platonnicks Change for shame	||	||	||Another copy on 139r; see no. 145
|-
| 96	||73v-74v	||Swift through ye yielding are I glide	||Hennery Lawes	|| || Published in Select Ayres and Dialogues (1669)
|-
| 97	||74v	||Alas poore Cupitt art thou blind || || ||Text only
|-
| 98	||75r-76r	||Wrong me more in thy complaint ||	||	||Text only
|-
| 99	||76r-77v	||Close by a fringed banck I found ||John willson || ||
|-
| 100	||78r	||Fly boy fly boy to the sellers  bottome || Simon Ives?	|| || Published in Select Ayres and Dialogues (1659)
|-
| 101	||78v-79r	||Sleepe O sleepe thou Sacrd dust || John Taylor? ||	||Dialogue; Composer identified as John Taylor by Cutts (1964)
|-
| 102	||80r	||Gloria tribuatur deo	||Thomas Brewer	||	||Latin text; trio with figured bass on facing page
|-
| 103	||80v	||Hallaluia hallaluia	|| Richard Dering || ||Another ascription crossed out; for two voice and two instruments
|-
| 104	||81r-82v	||Cleare the eyes of our watch	||Martin Llewellyn ||	||With chorus for three voices; (continued on 82r with “Now no more will wee harke to the charmes”
|-
| 105	||82v-83v	||Tis noe shame to yield to beauty	||William Lawes	||	||With chorus for three voices
|-
| 106	||84r-85r	||Cast youre caps and cares away	|| John Wilson 	|| John Fletcher ||Text from Beggar's Bush (1622); For two voices without accompaniment
|-
| 107	||85r-86r	||When each lynes a faithfull drinker	||William Lawes	||	||For three voices
|-
| 108	||86v-87v	||A Health a health a health to the nut browne lasse	|| William  Lawes	||  John Suckling ||from The Goblins (1636); dialogue with chorus for three voices
|-
| 109	||87v-88r	||Heres a Jolly couple	||William Lawes?	||	||Lacking bass for verse
|-
| 110	||88v-89r	||What should my mistresse doe with haire	||William Lawes || James Shirley ||from The Duke's Mistress (1638); With chorus for two voices
|-
| 111	||89r	||All these lye howling	||William Lawes? || [John Fletcher]	||For two voices without accompaniment; from The Mad Lover (revived 1630)
|-
| 112	||89v-92r	||Come from the dungeon to the throne	||Henry Lawes 	||  William Cartwright ||For varied combinations, one to five voices; in ten sections which Cutts, following Evans, divides as two separate entries, the second beginning at "Thou O bright sun." Each stanza is sung by a different voice (1st stanza tenor, 2nd stanza treble, and 3rd and 4th stanzas for bass), answered by a 5-part chorus.
|-
| 113	||92v-94v	||Now the sn is fled downe to leths bed	||Henry Lawes?	||  William Cartwright	||from The Royal Slave (1636); dialogue in eight sections with chorus; attributed elsewhere to William Lawes
|-
| 114	||95r-96r	||To bacchus wee to bacchus sing with wine and mirth	||"C C"	|| Thomas Killigrew   ||Attribution barely legible; identified by Cutts are Charles Coleman; with chorus for three voices
|-
| 115	||96v-97r	||Sacred loue whose virtues power	||William Lawes? ||  ||Dialogue
|-
| 116	||97r-98r	||Away with this cash twill make us all mad ||John Atkins || ||Dialogue with chorus
|-
| 117	||98r-98v	||Some loue Marce [=Mars] and some loue Venus ||Henry Lawes? ||	||Dialogue with chorus
|-
| 118	||99r-100r	||I preethee keepe my sheepe for mee	|| Nicholas Lanier || ||Dialogue; Published as a composition of Nicholas Lanier in Select Musicall Ayres and Dialogues (1652)
|-
| 119	||100r-100v	||Arise Arise fayre nymph arise	||	||	||Dialogue; incomplete at end
|-
| 120	||101r-101v	||On brauely on the foe is meet	|| Thomas Nabbes ||	||With chorus for three voices
|-
| 121	||102r-103r	||God morrow god morrow unto her ||William Lawes || James Shirley ||Dialogue with chorus; 
|-
| 122	||103r-105r	||Charon come heither Charon ||John Wilson || ||Ascribed elsewhere to John Hiton; dialogue with chorus
|-
| 123	||105v	||Tell mee dearest what is loue	||	|| Francis Beaumont	||from The Knight of the Burning Pestle (1607) dialogue with chorus
|-
| 124	||106r-107r	||Come heres to ye jack tis A cup of old sacke	|| Henry Lawes?	||	||Treble only
|-
| 125	||107v-108r	||Oh lett us howle som heauie noat	||Robert Johnson	||	||From The Duchess of Malfi (1613); with chorus for two voices without accompaniment
|-
| 126	||108r-109r	||Oh the fickle state off Louers	||	|| Francis Quarles ||Text only; Music attributed to William Lawes, though in some sources also attributed to Henry Lawes
|-
|127   || 109r-111r || Bringe outt ye could chine || John Wilson || || With chorus for 3 voices
|-
|128   || 111v || Pox on pelfe why should wee loue it || John Taylor || ||
|-
| 129	||112r-113r	||Come Adonis come again	||Henry Lawes?	|| John Tatham ||Attributed to William Lawes in Select Ayres and Dialogues (1659); The Treasury of Musick (1669); New Ayres and Dialogues, (1678); with chorus for two voices; 
|-
| 130	||113r-114r	||Hark hark how billona thunder’s ||Henry Lawes	|| ||For two or three voices without accompaniment
|-
|   - || 114v    || || ||  || Page is blank
|-
| 131	||115r-115v	||About with this brimmer my bullyes	|| || ||Dialogue with chorus
|-
|   - || 116r   || || ||  || Page is blank
|-
| 132	||116v-117r	||Lay yt sullen garland by thee	||John Taylor	|| ||With unaccompanied chorus for two voices
|-
|   - || 117v   || || ||  || Page is blank
|-
| 133	||118r-119r	||The Catts as other creates doe ||William Lawes || ||With chorus for two voices
|-
| 134	||119v-120r	||Heere is a boule in whose wide coasts	||John Atkins	|| ||With chorus for three voices
|-
|   - || 120v    || || ||  || Page is blank
|-
| 135	||121r-122v	||Say puritan ist come to passé by I know not who || ||	||Bass incomplete; chorus for two voices
|-
| 136	||122v-124r	||Blood thirsty care goe packe	||	||	||With chorus for two voices
|-
| 137	||124v-125r	||Come drawer some wine or wele pull downe your signe	||	||	||Included in Thomas Weaver's "Love and Drollery" (1654), "Rump" (1662), and "Loyal Garland" (1686); for two voices without accompaniment
|-
| 138	||125v-126r	||Hast your nymphes makehast away	||John willson	||	||Dialogue with chorus for two voices
|-
| 139	||126v-127v	||You that delight in concord liston	||	||	||For three voices; incomplete
|-
|   - || 128r-130r   || || ||  || Pages are blank
|-
| 140	||130v-131r	||Collin say why sitts thow soe	||"Mr Eyves" (Simon Ives?)	||	||The attribution of this song to a Mr. Eyves has been questioned, as it is attributed to Nicholas Lanier in at least three other sources
|-
| 141	||131v-133v	||Gett you hence for I must goe where it fitts not you to know	||	||	||Dialogue; setting incomplete: music missing after measure 19
|-
| 142	||133v	||There can bee noe glad man compared to the mad man	|| ||	||Incomplete; another copy of no. 144 on f. 137v; Text published in "Wit and Mirth" (1701)
|-
|   - || 134r   || || ||  || Page is blank
|-
| 143	||134v-137r	||Vp vp and be gon thou wanton heate ||Henry Lawes || ||Dialogue with chorus for two voices
|-
| 144	||137v-138v	||There can bee noe glad man	||Will Lawes || ||With chorus for three voices; see no. 142, folio 133v
|-
| 145	||139r-139v	||Change platonikts change for sham	||	||	||For two voices without accompaniment; see no. 95 on f. 72v; Published in Select Ayres and Dialogues (1653, 1659); The Treasury of Musick (1669)
|-
| 146	||139v-140v	||To ye hall for Justc [=Justice] wee call	||Yo. Yorkney	|| Alexander Brome ||For two voices without accompaniment; The inscription "Yo. Yorkney" may refer to John Yowckney; Cutts identified the composer as Alexander Brome 
|-
| 147	||141r-141v	||A pox o those od mates ||John Atkinson [i.e. Atkins?]	|| Henry Bold ||With chorus for two voices
|-
| 148	||142r-143v	||Joyne thy inameld Checke to myne	||John Pamball [John Gamble?] || Thomas Jordan ||With chorus for two voices
|-
| 149	||144r	||Be quick my boyes : Coras [=chorus]	||John Atkins	||	||Chorus for two voices
|-
|   - || 144v  || || ||  || Page is blank
|-
|}

 See also 
 Drexel 4257
 Edward F. Rimbault

 Notes 

 Bibliography 

 Facsimile Drexel 4041. Vol. 9 of English song, 1600-1675: Facsimiles of Twenty-Six Manuscripts and an Edition of the Texts, ed. with introductions by Elise Bickford Jorgens. New York: Garland, 1987.

Works cited 

 Additional works 
Collier, John Payne. "John Wilson, the singer. ... " The Shakespeare Society's Papers (1845), p. 33-36.
Cutts, John P. "A John Payne Collier Unfabricated 'Fabrication'." Notes and Queries (March 1959), p. 104-06.
Cutts, John P. "An Unpublished Contemporary Setting of a Shakespeare Song." Shakespeare Survey (1956), p. 86-89.
Cutts, John P. La Musique de Scene de la Troupe de Shakespeare. Paris: Éditions du Centre National de la Recherche Scientifique, 1959.
Cutts, John P. "Music and 'The Mad Lover." Studies in the Renaissance (1961), p. 236-48.
Cutts, John P. "'Songs vnto the lute and violl'." Musica Disciplina (1961), xv.
Cutts, John P. "Thomas Heywood's 'The gentry to the King's Head' in 'The Rape of Lucrece and John Wilson's setting." Notes and Queries (October 1961), p. 384-87.
Cutts, John P. "Thomas Nabbes's Hannibal and Scipio." English Miscellany (1963), p. 73-81.
Cutts, John P. "Two Jacobean Theatre Songs." Music and Letters (October 1952), p. 333-34.
Cutts, John P. "William Lawes's Writing for the Theatre and the Court." The Library (December 1952), p. 225-34.
Day, Cyrus L. and Eleanor B. Murrie. English Song Books, 1651-1702. Oxford, 1940.
Duckles, Vincent. "The Music for the Lyrics in Early Seventeenth-Century Drama: A Bibliography of Primary Sources," in Music in English Renaissance Drama, ed. John H. Long. Lexington, 1968. p. 117-60.
Evans, Willa McClung. "The Rose: A Song by Wilson and Lovelace." Modern Language Quarterly (September 1946), p. 269-78.
Evans, Willa McClung. "Lovelace's Concept of Prison Life in The Vintage to the Dungeon." Philological Quarterly (January 1947), p. 62-68.
Evans, Willa McClung. "Hobson Appears in Comic Song." Philological Quarterly (October 1947), p. 321-27.
Evans, Willa McClung, Lefkowitz, Murray. William Lawes''. London, 1960.

External links 

NYPL Catalog record
Entry in RISM database

17th-century manuscripts
Baroque music manuscript sources
Books on English music
English manuscripts
Manuscripts in the New York Public Library
Music anthologies